Mark Wolf may refer to:

 Mark L. Wolf (born 1946), American judge
 Mark Soldier Wolf, Arapaho tribal elder, US Marine Corps and story teller